Christian Doerfler (March 2, 1862 in Milwaukee, Wisconsin – June 10, 1934) was a justice of the Wisconsin Supreme Court. He graduated from the University of Wisconsin Law School in 1885. Doerfler was married to Julia Anderson. They had one son.

Public service and career
Doerfler was Commissioner of Milwaukee Public Schools before serving as Assistant District Attorney of Milwaukee County, Wisconsin from 1889 to 1891. He was a delegate to the Republican National Convention in 1912 and 1916. In 1921, he was appointed to the Supreme Court by Governor John J. Blaine. Doerfler remained a member until his resignation in 1929 after he began to suffer from poor health.

References

Politicians from Milwaukee
Justices of the Wisconsin Supreme Court
Wisconsin Republicans
Wisconsin lawyers
University of Wisconsin Law School alumni
1862 births
1934 deaths
Lawyers from Milwaukee